Sir Henry Rowley Bishop (18 November 178730 April 1855) was an English composer from the early Romantic era. He is most famous for the songs "Home! Sweet Home!" and "Lo! Hear the Gentle Lark." He was the composer or arranger of some 120 dramatic works, including 80 operas, light operas, cantatas, and ballets. Bishop was Knighted in 1842.  Bishop worked for all the major theatres of London in his era – including the Royal Opera House at Covent Garden, the Theatre Royal, Drury Lane, Vauxhall Gardens and the Haymarket Theatre, and was Professor of Music at the universities of Edinburgh and Oxford. His second wife was the noted soprano Anna Bishop, who scandalised British society by leaving him and conducting an open liaison with the harpist Nicolas-Charles Bochsa until the latter's death in Sydney.

Life

Bishop was born in London, where his father was a watchmaker and haberdasher. At the age of 13, Bishop left full-time education and worked as a music-publisher with his cousin. After training as a jockey at Newmarket, he took some lessons in harmony from Francesco Bianchi in London. In 1804 he wrote the music to a piece called "Angelina", which was performed at Margate.

He wrote the music for a ballet, Tamerlan et Bajazet, which opened in 1806 at the King's Theatre, Haymarket and led to a permanent post. His first opera, The Circassian Bride, was performed at the Theatre Royal, Drury Lane on 23 February 1809, but on the following night the theatre burned down, forcing him to re-write the score from memory. The prima donna of that production, a Miss Lyons, became Bishop's first wife.

After his second success on the stage with The Maniac (1810), Bishop became music director of Covent Garden for the next 14 years. In 1813, he was a founding member of the Royal Philharmonic Society. In 1825 Bishop was induced by Robert Elliston to transfer his services from Covent Garden to the rival house in Drury Lane, for which he wrote, among others, the opera Aladdin, based on the story from 1001 Nights. It was intended to compete with Weber's Oberon, commissioned by the other house. Aladdin failed, and Bishop's career as an operatic composer came to an end. He did, however, rework operas by other composers. An 1827 Covent Garden playbill records a performance of the Marriage of Figaro with "The Overture and Music selected chiefly from Mozart's operas – the new music by Mr Bishop". It included an aria called Follow, follow o'er the mountain, sung by Miss Paton.

In 1841 he was appointed Reid Professor of Music in the University of Edinburgh, but resigned the office in 1843. In 1848 he became Heather Professor of Music at the University of Oxford, succeeding William Crotch, until 1853.

According to William Denslow, Bishop was a freemason. Bishop was knighted in 1842, the first composer ever to receive that honour.

Bishop's later years were clouded by scandal. He had married his second wife, the singer Ann Rivière, daughter of Daniel Riviere and sister of Robert Riviere, in 1831. She was twenty-three years younger than he, and they had three children. In 1839, Anna Bishop (as she was now known) abandoned her husband and three children to run off with her lover and accompanist, the harpist and composer Nicolas-Charles Bochsa. They left England to give concert tours abroad until Bochsa died in Sydney, Australia, in 1856. Anna Bishop sang on every continent and was the most widely travelled opera singer of the 19th century.

Sir Henry Bishop died in poverty in London, although he had a substantial income during his lifetime. He is buried in East Finchley Cemetery in north London. Bishop is commemorated on the south side of the Albert Memorial in Kensington Gardens by a relief sculpture on the Frieze of Parnassus, which depicts influential composers, architects, poets, painters, and sculptors; he is the only 19th century British composer represented.

Music

Bishop's "operas" were written in a style and format that satisfied the audiences of his day. They have more in common with the earlier, native English ballad opera genre, or with modern musicals, than the classical opera of continental Europe with full recitatives. His first opera, The Circassian's Bride (1809), had one performance at Drury Lane before the theatre burned down and the score was lost. Bishop reconstructed it from memory.

Between 1816 and 1828, Bishop composed the music for a series of Shakespearean operas staged by Frederic Reynolds. But these, and the numerous works, operas, burlettas, cantatas, incidental music etc. which he wrote are mostly forgotten. Even his limited partnering with various composers including Joseph Edwards Carpenter, Thomas Simpson Cooke and Stephen Glover are often overlooked. The year 1816 also saw the composition of a string quartet in C minor.

His most successful operas were The Virgin of the Sun (1812), The Miller and his Men (1813), Guy Mannering (1816), and Clari, or the Maid of Milan (1823). Clari, with a libretto by the American John Howard Payne, included the song Home! Sweet Home!, which became enormously popular. In 1852 Bishop 'relaunched' the song as a parlour ballad. It was popular in the United States throughout the American Civil War and after.

According to music historian Anne Gilchrist:

'If a postscript by another hand may follow Mr. Frank Kidson's* most illuminating true story of the origin of Home, Sweet Home,' in the November number of THE CHOIR, musical readers may perhaps be interested to learn that the melody was vastly improved by compression in Sir Henry Bishop's later edition of it (the one now familiar). The original so-called 'Sicilian Air,' which Bishop - as Mr. Kidson has told - confessed to having written himself for lack of the required specimen of Sicilian melody, is a tedious affair, with much repetition. The first two bars (now counted as four) of the melody are sung, with the variation of a single note, four times, and after two bars of something a little different, a fifth time. It is as if one sang the strain,
‘ 'Mid pleasures and palaces though we may roam, Be it never so humble, there's no place like home,’
twice over, then two bars of variation, then the music of the above two lines once more. There is as yet no refrain of 'Home, sweet home,' but instead, the strain belonging to 'There's no place like home, there's no place like home' is sung (except for one note) twice over, as a conclusion.
The truth as it appears to me is that Bishop's notion of Sicilian music was exclusively derived from the hymn-tune 'Sicilian Mariners,' whose character he imitated as closely as prudence would allow.'

Also of note is Bishop's 1819 musical comedy adaptation of William Shakespeare's The Comedy of Errors, which included the popular coloratura soprano aria "Lo! Here the Gentle Lark."

Bishop's last work was the commissioned music for the ode at the installation of Lord Derby as chancellor of the University of Oxford in 1853.

Principal works

Stage works
The Maniac, or The Swiss Banditti (1810), opera
The Brazen Bust (1813), melodrama
The Miller and His Men (1813), melodrama
Sadak and Kalasrade, or The Waters of Oblivion (1814), opera
Brother and Sister (1815), entertainment
Guy Mannering (1816), musical play
December and May (1818), operetta
The Heart of Mid-Lothian (1819), musical drama
The Comedy of Errors (1819), musical comedy
The Battle of Bothwell Brigg (1820), musical romance
Henri Quatre, or, Paris in the olden time (1820), musical romance
Clari, or the Maid of Milan (1823), opera
As You Like It (1824), musical comedy
Alladin (1826), opera
Yelva, or The Orphan of Russia (1829), musical drama

Cantatas/Oratorios
The Jolly Beggars (Robert Burns) (1817), cantata
Waterloo (1826), cantata
The Seventh Day (John Milton) (1833), sacred cantata
The Departure from Paradise (Milton) (1836), sacred cantata
The Fallen Angel (1839), oratorio

Instrumental music
Grand Sinfonia in C major (1805) for orchestra
Concertante (1807) for flute, oboe, bassoon, violin and double bass
String Quartet in C minor (1816)
Overture (alla Irlandese) (1823) for piano
A Lament (1829) for piano

Notes

References
F. Corder: "The Works of Sir Henry Bishop", in: The Musical Quarterly, vol. iv no. 1 (1918), pp. 78–97.
M. Faul: "Nicolas-Charles Bochsa, harpiste, compositeur, escroc"  (editions Delatour, France 2003)
Grove Music Online, Bishop, Sir Henry R(owley).
Kidson, F. 1900, British Music Publishers, Printers and Engravers from Queen Elizabeth’s Reign to George the Fourth’s, Hill & Sons, London.

External links

 Musical Manuscripts Collection at the Harry Ransom Center
 
 

 Henry R. Bishop recordings at the Discography of American Historical Recordings.

1786 births
1855 deaths
19th-century classical composers
19th-century British composers
19th-century English musicians
19th-century British male musicians
Academics of the University of Edinburgh
Burials at East Finchley Cemetery
Composers awarded knighthoods
English classical composers
English male classical composers
English opera composers
English Romantic composers
Glee composers
Heather Professors of Music
Knights Bachelor
Male opera composers
Musicians from London